Charlotte Emerson Brown (April 21, 1838 – February 5, 1895) was an American woman notable as the creator and first president of the General Federation of Women's Clubs (GFWC), a progressive women's movement in America beginning in the 1890s. During her presidency, membership expanded quickly from 50 cultural clubs to several hundred, and grew to representing tens of thousands of women. She was instrumental in the GFWC's formation of state-level organizations.

Early life and education
Brown was born in Andover, Massachusetts to Reverend Ralph Emerson and Eliza Rockwell. Brown's father was a professor of ecclesiastical history and pastoral theology at Andover Theological Seminary. 

Brown was an avid reader and student who spoke many languages. She graduated from the Abbot Academy of Andover.

Career
Brown taught in Montreal with Hannah Lyman, Vassar's first female president, and studied business in Chicago. Brown's first clubs were a music club and a French club, and her home in Illinois hosted literary, musical and artistic events. She worked part time as a teacher; from 1879-1880, she served as Jane Addams's teacher of the German language. 

She became president of the Woman's Club of Orange. In 1890, she was elected president of the General Federation of Women's Clubs, an organization which encouraged women to educate themselves and become advocates in their communities. Members advocated for clean milk, street lights, and libraries, as well as for regulations regarding child labor and child and maternal health. According to one viewpoint, the exclusion of men in these clubs was helpful in allowing women to develop their own leadership skills. Under Brown's leadership, the organization grew from an initial meeting of delegates from sixty-one clubs to 475,000 U.S. women from 2,865 clubs in the mid-1920s, and was notable for assisting the career development of advocates such as Eleanor Roosevelt. Membership peaked at 830,000 members in 1955. Brown served as the organization's president until 1894.

Personal life
Brown married William Bryant Brown on July 20, 1880, a congregational pastor who served parishes in several states. The couple settled in East Orange, New Jersey. Charlotte Brown died on February 4, 1895, and was buried in Mount Pleasant Cemetery in Newark, New Jersey.

Notes

References

Further reading
 Emerson, Benjamin K. The Ipswich Emersons (1900)
 Houde, Mary Jean. Reaching Out: A Story of the General Federation of Women’s Clubs (1989)
 Swanson, Cynthia N. Brown, Charlotte Emerson American National Biography (2000) online
 Wells, Mildred White. Unity in Diversity: The History of the General Federation of Women’s Clubs (1953).
 Wood, Mrs Mary I. Stevens. The History of the General Federation of Women's Clubs: For the first twenty-two years of its organization (History department, General federation of women's clubs, 1912).  online

External links
 
 

1838 births
1895 deaths
People from Andover, Massachusetts
schoolteachers from Massachusetts
Abbot Academy alumni
Wikipedia articles incorporating text from A Woman of the Century
Clubwomen